Campo de Daroca is one of the comarcas of Aragon, in the Province of Zaragoza, Aragon, Spain. It is located in the mountainous Iberian System area.

Municipalities
The comarca includes the municipalities of Acered, Aldehuela de Liestos, Anento, Atea, Badules, Balconchán, Berrueco, Cerveruela, Cubel, Las Cuerlas, Daroca, Fombuena, Gallocanta, Herrera de los Navarros, Langa del Castillo, Lechón, Luesma, Mainar, Manchones, Murero, Nombrevilla, Orcajo, Retascón, Romanos, Santed, Torralba de los Frailes, Torralbilla, Used, Val de San Martín, Valdehorna, Villadoz, Villanueva de Jiloca, Villar de los Navarros, Villarreal de Huerva and Villarroya del Campo.

Geography
It borders the Comunidad de Calatayud and Campo de Cariñena to the north, Señorío de Molina (in the province of  Guadalajara) to the southwest, Jiloca to the south and Campo de Belchite to the east.

References

This article includes content from the Spanish Wikipedia article Campo de Daroca.

External links
Official website 

Comarcas of Aragon
Geography of the Province of Zaragoza